National Route A010 is a highway in the northeast of Chubut Province, Argentina. It has a length of  joining National Route 3 at its km marker 1,395, with the city of Puerto Madryn, in Biedma Department.

The road continues west of National Route 3 as Provincial Route 4. By National Decree #1595 of 1979 the section of Provincial Route 4 east of National Route 3 changed to federal control.

On km marker 2.2 there is the Puerto Madryn aero-club and airfield.

References

National roads in Chubut Province
Tourism in Argentina